Romer's gap is an example of an apparent gap in the tetrapod fossil record used in the study of evolutionary biology. Such gaps represent periods from which excavators have not yet found relevant fossils. Romer's gap is named after paleontologist Alfred Romer, who first recognised it. Recent discoveries in Scotland are beginning to close this gap in palaeontological knowledge.

Age
Romer's gap ran from approximately 360 to 345 million years ago, corresponding to the first 15 million years of the Carboniferous, the early Mississippian (starting with the Tournaisian and moving into the Visean). The gap forms a discontinuity between the primitive forests and high diversity of fishes in the end Devonian and more modern aquatic and terrestrial assemblages of the early Carboniferous.

Mechanism behind the gap
There has been long debate as to why there are so few fossils from this time period. Some have suggested the problem was of fossilization itself, suggesting that there may have been differences in the geochemistry of the time that did not favour fossil formation. Also, excavators simply may not have dug in the right places. The existence of a true low point in vertebrate diversity has been supported by independent lines of evidence, however recent finds in five new locations in Scotland have yielded multiple fossils of early tetrapods and amphibians. They have also allowed the most accurate logging of the geology of this period. This new evidence suggests that - at least locally - there was no gap in diversity or changes in oxygen geochemistry.

While initial arthropod terrestriality was well under way before the gap, and some digited tetrapods might have come on land, there are remarkably few terrestrial or aquatic fossils that date from the gap itself. Recent work on Paleozoic geochemistry has provided evidence for the biological reality of Romer's gap in both terrestrial vertebrates and arthropods, and has correlated it with a period of unusually low atmospheric oxygen concentration, which was determined from the idiosyncratic geochemistry of rocks formed during Romer's gap. The new sedimentary logging in the Ballagan Formation in Scotland challenges this, suggesting oxygen was stable throughout Romer's Gap.

Aquatic vertebrates, which include most tetrapods during the Carboniferous, were recovering from the end-Devonian extinction, a major extinction event that preceded Romer's gap, one on par with that which killed the dinosaurs. In this Hangenberg event, most marine and freshwater groups became extinct or were reduced to a few lineages, although the precise mechanism of the extinction is unclear. Before the event, oceans and lakes were dominated by lobe-finned fishes and armored fishes called placoderms. After the gap, modern ray finned fish, as well as sharks and their relatives were the dominant forms. The period also saw the demise of the Ichthyostegalia, the early fish-like amphibians with more than five digits.

The low diversity of marine fishes, particularly shell-crushing predators (durophages), at the beginning of Romer's gap is supported by the sudden abundance of hard-shelled crinoid echinoderms during the same period. The Tournaisian has even been called the "Age of Crinoids". Once the number of shell-crushing ray-finned fishes and sharks increased later in the Carboniferous, coincident with the end of Romer's gap, the diversity of crinoids with Devonian-type armor plummeted, following the pattern of a classic predator-prey (Lotka-Volterra) cycle. There is increasing evidence that lungfish and stem tetrapods and amphibians recovered quickly and diversified in the rapidly changing environment of the end-Devonian and Romer's Gap.

Gap fauna

The gap in the tetrapod record has been progressively closed with the discoveries of such early Carboniferous tetrapods as Pederpes and Crassigyrinus. There are a few sites where vertebrate fossils have been found to help fill in the gap, such as the East Kirkton Quarry, in Bathgate, Scotland, a long-known fossil site that was revisited by Stanley P. Wood in 1984 and has since been revealing a number of early tetrapods in the mid Carboniferous; "literally dozens of tetrapods came rolling out: Balanerpeton (a temnospondyl), Silvanerpeton and Eldeceeon (basal anthracosaurs), all in multiple copies, and one spectacular proto-amniote, Westlothiana", Paleos Project reports. In 2016, five new species were found across the Ballagan Formation: Perittodus apsconditus, Koilops herma, Ossirarus kierani, Diploradus austiumensis, Aytonerpeton microps. These stem tetrapods and amphibians provide evidence for an early split between the two groups, and rapid diversification in the Early Carboniferous.

However, tetrapod material in the earliest stage of the Carboniferous, the Tournaisian, remains scarce relative to fishes in the same habitats, which can appear in large death assemblages, and is unknown until late in the stage. Fish faunas from Tournaisian sites around the world are very alike in composition, containing common and ecologically similar species of ray-finned fishes, rhizodont lobe-finned fishes, acanthodians, sharks, and holocephalans.

Recent analysis of the Blue Beach deposits in Nova Scotia suggest that "the early tetrapod fauna is not easily divisible into Devonian and Carboniferous faunas, suggesting that some tetrapods passed through the end Devonian extinction event unaffected."

Tournaisian-age locations
For many years after Romer's gap was first recognised, only two sites yielding Tournaisian-age tetrapod fossils were known;  one is in East Lothian, Scotland, and another in Blue Beach, Nova Scotia, where in 1841, Sir William Logan, the first Director of the Geological Survey of Canada, found footprints from a tetrapod.  Blue Beach maintains a fossil museum that displays hundreds of Tournaisian fossils, which continue to be found as the cliff erodes to reveal new fossils.

In 2012, 350-million-year-old tetrapod remains from four new Tournaisian sites in Scotland were announced, including those from a primitive amphibian nicknamed "Ribbo". In 2016, five more species were unearthed from these localities, proving Scotland to be one of the most important sites in the world for understanding this time period.

These localities are the coast of Burnmouth, the banks of the Whiteadder Water near Chirnside, the River Tweed near Coldstream, and the rocks near Tantallon Castle alongside the Firth of Forth. Fossils of both aquatic and terrestrial tetrapods are known from these localities, providing an important record of the transition between life in water and life on land and filling some of the lacunae in Romer's gap. These new localities may represent a larger fauna, as all lie within a short distance of each other and share many fishes with the nearby and contemporary Foulden fish bed locality (which has not produced tetrapods thus far). As with East Kirkton Quarry, tetrapods at these sites were discovered through the long-term efforts of Stan Wood and colleagues.

In April 2013 scientists associated with the British Geological Survey (BGS) and the National Museums of Scotland announced the TW:eed project (Tetrapod World: early evolution and diversification). This project includes collaborators from across the UK, and aims to gather knowledge on the end-Devonian Early-Carboniferous world. One aim has been to drill a continuous  borehole at an undisclosed location near Berwick-upon-Tweed. This has produced a complete, centimetre-scale sampling of Tournaisian sediment, without discontinuities, providing a timeline on which fossil discoveries can be accurately placed. In the most recent paper to be produced by the TW:eed team, they announced some initial results from the core, including the apparent lack of oxygen excursion across Romer's Gap. This suggests that previous theories about low oxygen being the cause of Romer's Gap will need to be re-evaluated.

See also
Arthropod gap
Sauropod hiatus

References

Notes 

Paleontological concepts and hypotheses
Evolution of tetrapods
Carboniferous Scotland
 
 
Fossils of Scotland
Gaps in the fossil record